Pseudolymphoma is a benign lymphocytic infiltrate that resembles cutaneous lymphoma histologically, clinically, or both.

Lymphoma cutis is the most important type of pseudolymphoma.

Presentation
It manifests with diarrhoea, hepatosplenomegaly, moderate lymph node enlargement without histopathological changes and evidence of the reticulo-endothelial system involvement.

Cause

It is an adverse effect of phenytoin.

Diagnosis

References

External links 

Lymphoid-related cutaneous conditions